Nicole Lilly Christou (born 22 July 2004; known professionally as Nikki Lilly) is a British charity campaigner, YouTuber, author and television presenter. Christou was awarded the International Emmy Kids Awards in 2019, for her episode of the CBBC series My Life, Nikki Lilly Meets,  Nikki Lilly Bakes and has appeared in Celebrity Supply Teacher doing a lesson on vlogging. and is the youngest ever recipient of the BAFTA Special Award. In 2016, Christou received the Child of Courage award at the Pride of Britain Awards.

Early life
At age six, Christou was first diagnosed with arteriovenous malformation (AVM), a rare medical condition that has required treatment with numerous operations, and which has visibly changed her physical appearance. She missed 4 months of primary school and went to America multiple times for treatment.

Christou first became known for her YouTube videos, which she started making at the age of eight, to share her experiences of living with a 'visible difference'. Her YouTube channel covers topics including living with a chronic illness, bullying, mental health, baking and beauty.

Television work 
Christou has been the subject of two episodes of the CBBC documentary series My Life: Born to Vlog, and I Will Survive.

In 2016, Christou won the fourth series of the Junior Bake Off competition, and in 2018 Christou started presenting the CBBC show Nikki Lilly Meets…, in which she interviews politicians and celebrities including tennis player Andy Murray and former Prime Minister Theresa May.

The Butterfly AVM Charity 
Christou and her parents set up The Butterfly AVM Charity to raise awareness of AVM, raise funds for research into the condition, and to support sufferers and their families.

Book
In October 2020, Christou's book, Nikki Lilly's Come on Life: The Highs and Lows on How to Live Your Best Teen Life, was published by Walker Books.

References

Living people
2004 births
British people of Greek descent
British YouTubers